Ichikawa (written:  lit. "market river") is a Japanese surname. Notable people with the surname include:

, Japanese footballer
Ichikawa Danjūrō and Ichikawa Ebizō, stage names taken on by a series of kabuki actors of the Ichikawa family since the 17th century
Daisuke Ichikawa (born 1980), Japanese football midfielder
Fusae Ichikawa (1893–1981), Japanese feminist, politician and women's suffrage leader
Haruyo Ichikawa (1913–2004), Japanese film actress
Jun Ichikawa (1948–2008), Japanese film director
Kon Ichikawa (1915–2008), Japanese film director
, Japanese actress
Mayumi Ichikawa (born 1976), Japanese long-distance runner
Mikako Ichikawa (born 1978), Japanese actress and model, sister of Miwako Ichikawa
Miori Ichikawa (born 1994), former member of NMB48
Miwako Ichikawa (born 1976), Japanese actress, sister of Mikako Ichikawa
, Japanese actress
Raizo Ichikawa (1931–1969), Japanese film and kabuki actor
Stalker Ichikawa (born 1974), Japanese professional wrestler
, Japanese voice actor
Takuji Ichikawa (born 1962),  Japanese novelist
, Japanese ice hockey player
, Japanese baseball player
Utaemon Ichikawa, (1907–1999), Japanese film actor
Yoshiko Ichikawa (born 1976), Japanese long-distance runner
Yosuke Ichikawa, keyboard player in the Japanese male pop band, The Babystars
Yui Ichikawa (born 1986), Japanese actress and model, also known as Yui-nyan
Yuichi Ichikawa, from the Japanese band the Indigo
, Japanese footballer

Fictional characters
Mayura Ichikawa, a character from the anime series Best Student Council
Reiko Ichikawa, a character from the anime series Infinite Ryvius
Hiroshi Ichikawa, a character from the anime series Hungry Heart: Wild Striker
Hiroshi and Utako Ichikawa, a character from the manga and anime series Kaibutsu-kun

Japanese-language surnames